Venustodus is an extinct genus of eugeneodontid holocephalid from the Carboniferous of the Komi Republic of Russia, and in similarly aged strata in the United States  The generic name is from Ancient Greek, meaning Tooth of Venus. The genus is believed to be of cosmopolitan distribution due to the discovery of specimens across two continents within the same period. The individual teeth are heterodontal, measuring between 8-9mm (0.3 inches), with unusual curvature familiar among members of Eugeneodontida, growing in the shape reminiscent of a pair of Locking pliers, hundreds of teeth continuing to grow and cause pre-existing teeth to protrude outwards. Teeth that were recovered from Warsaw, Illinois showed signs of wear due to crushing hard-shelled invertebrates and mollusks, leading to the conclusion that it is durophagous.

References

Sources
 Vertebrate Palaeontology by Michael J. Benton

Carboniferous fish of Europe
Eugeneodontida
Carboniferous cartilaginous fish
Prehistoric cartilaginous fish genera